Hold Me is the debut EP by the American Christian hip hop artist, Jamie Grace. In addition to TobyMac being featured in the title track, the EP was produced by TobyMac and was released on his label, Gotee Records. "Into Jesus", listed as the second track, is a cover of a 1998 DC Talk song.

Track listing

Music videos
"Hold Me" featuring TobyMac and GabeReal from DiverseCity - (May 3, 2011)

References

2011 debut EPs
Jamie Grace albums
Christian hip hop EPs
2011 EPs